Wilfred Aikens Cowes (10 July 1896 — 17 January 1972) was an Argentine first-class cricketer.

Cowes was born at Lomas de Zamora in July 1896. He played first-class cricket for Argentina in December 1926 and January 1927, making three appearances against the touring Marylebone Cricket Club, playing two matches at the Belgrano Athletic Club and one at the Hurlingham Club. He scored 85 runs in these three matches at an average of 17.00, and with a highest score of 47. Cowes died in Argentina in January 1972.

References

External links

1896 births
1972 deaths
People from Lomas de Zamora
Argentine people of English descent
Argentine cricketers
Sportspeople from Buenos Aires Province